Midway is an unincorporated community in Howard County, Arkansas, United States.

References

Unincorporated communities in Howard County, Arkansas
Unincorporated communities in Arkansas